Egoli: Place of Gold was a bilingual (English and Afrikaans) South African soap opera which first aired on M-Net on 6 April 1992. South African television's first daily soap opera, on 3 December 1999 Egoli became the first South African television programme in any genre to reach 2,000 episodes. As of 3 August 2007, 4,000 episodes had aired. Egoli:  Place of Gold aired its final episode on 31 March 2010, after 18 years of acting from South African and international actors.

The series was set in Johannesburg. The city of Johannesburg is also known by its isiZulu name, "eGoli", which means "the place of gold". Egoli was created by Franz Marx. The show is known in Afrikaans as Egoli: Plek van Goud.

Egoli was "aimed at women of all nationalities between the ages of 25 and 45, with middle or upper incomes." The series aired Monday to Friday at 18:00. However, on from April 2009, M-Net moved Egoli to the 18:30 timeslot.

The series had a large following, and "Egoli Spectaculars" were held countrywide each year for fans of the series to meet the cast. These spectaculars offered publicity for the series but also raised money for charity.

Cast members

International Guest stars:
Joan Collins as Catherine Sinclair (Season 1)
Jackie Collins
Richard Steinmetz as Jeff Hartman (Season 2)
James Horan
Perry Stevens
Samantha Fox
Jerry Springer
Helmut Lotti

Seasons

International edition

The TV series was broadcast outside of South Africa, in neighbouring countries in the original bilingual Afrikaans-English version, and, beginning in May 1997, in an English-only international version. The bilingual version was shown in Botswana, Zimbabwe, and Namibia, where Afrikaans was spoken or widely understood. In the late 1990s, the English version was broadcast in at least 9 African countries: Nigeria, Ghana, Cameroon, Zambia, Ethiopia, Uganda, Kenya, Tanzania, and Mauritius.

At one time in the 1990s, the series was shown in at least 30 countries.

In creating the international version, all Afrikaans-language scenes were filmed twice, first in Afrikaans, then in English. To make the series more appealing to non-South African audiences, typical South African sayings and customs, were deleted from the international edition.

Egoli was also dubbed in Spanish for broadcast in some South American countries.

Parodies
Egoli: Place of Gold was one of the South African soaps to be parodied by comedian Casper de Vries in his soap parody Haak en Steek.

Demise
The final episode of the series aired on 31 March 2010. The final episode included surprises and special guests and ended at the memorial.

Movie

It was announced in August 2009 that a movie entitled Egoli – The Movie would conclude the longest-running soap opera in South African history. The movie was produced by series creator and writer Franz Marx, in cooperation with Burgert Muller, a co-producer of the TV series, and Pieter Venter of Brigadiers-Franz Marx Films. The feature film was released in South African cinemas on 16 June 2010 and starred many cast members from the TV show including David Rees, Shaleen Surtie-Richards, Tiffany Kelly, Christine Basson, Brümilda van Rensburg, and Lerato Motau. Some sources list the title of the movie as Egoli: Afrikaners is Plesierig.

Other media and products

A book entitled Franz Marx's Egoli 2000 by Reinet Louw was published by Human & Rousseau in 1999. The English-language edition was a translation of the Afrikaans-language edition, Franz Marx se Egoli 2000, also published in 1999. The book related how the show was developed, recounted storylines from the first 8 years of the show, provided biographical sketches of characters, and included photographs of cast members.

A cookbook featuring recipes by characters in the series (including Nenna, Elsa, Donna, and Mrs. Naidoo) was published during the program's run and ranked number 1 on the South African top ten best-seller list for several weeks. The recipes featured in the cookbook were collected by South African restaurateurs Eduan Naudé and Brian Shalkoff.

During the early years of its run, the TV show marketed a sticker book and stickers featuring pictures of the actors from the series.

After the series concluded in 2010, a double-disc DVD entitled Egoli 18 was released. The DVD featured highlights from each year of the series' 18-year-run, repackaged into new 24-minute episodes by the show's creator, Franz Marx. Episodes were introduced by actors, writers, and other notable personalities who were affiliated with or fans of the show.

The show also marketed its own fragrance. The perfume, named "Essence of Gold."

Clothes featured in the TV series, designed by fictional character Freddie Vermeulen of Louwna Fashions, were also sold in South African shops at one time.

References

External links
 Official website
 
 TVSA's Egoli: Place Of Gold site

See also

1992 South African television series debuts
South African television soap operas
M-Net original programming
1990s South African television series
2000s South African television series
2010s South African television series
Television shows set in Johannesburg, South Africa